The 1891 Richmond Colts football team was an American football team that represented Richmond College—now known as the University of Richmond—as an independent during the 1891 college football season. The team went winless and was coached by Dana Rucker.

Schedule

References

Richmond
Richmond Spiders football seasons
College football winless seasons
Richmond Colts football